William Lyttle (1931–2010) was a British civil engineer notable for digging an extensive network of tunnels under his home in London.

Excavation 
Lyttle, originally from Ireland, inherited a 20-room property in the London borough of Hackney. In the mid-sixties he dug out a wine cellar under his home. Having done so, he said that he had "found a taste for the thing" and kept on digging, for some forty years. He created a network of tunnels, wide and narrow, on several levels. One excavation connected with the Dalston Lane tunnel, and the railway line.

Lyttle dumped the clay he dug up in his garden and sometimes in empty rooms of the house. At some time he stopped maintaining his house and the building fell into disrepair.

Lyttle's work attracted complaints from neighbours when sinkholes began to appear in the pavement, and when water and power supplies were interrupted. The local pub also expressed concern that its cellar could collapse into one of Lyttle's tunnels. Serious complaints to Hackney Council may have started around the turn of the century, leading to inspections but at first not to firm actions. Because of the state of the house and the complaints an ultrasound inspection was carried out in 2006, revealing the extent of the tunnels.

When asked by journalists why he had excavated the tunnels, he said "I'm just a man who loves to dig" and that he just wanted "a big basement". He also said that "There is great beauty in inventing things that serve no purpose."

Lyttle was dubbed "The Mole Man of Hackney" by the press.

Legal challenges
Lyttle was evicted in 2006, and Hackney Borough Council filled the tunnels with aerated concrete. He contested the decision in court and returned to his home for a short time. In 2008, the High Court of Justice ordered that Lyttle cover the costs of the council making the structure safe, at a total of £293,000.

After this, Lyttle was moved to a hotel for three years, before being rehoused in an apartment in a high-rise building. He was put on the top floor, to discourage tunnelling. While there he knocked a hole in a dividing wall between two rooms.

Property after Lyttle 

Some 33 tonnes of soil and debris were removed from Lyttle's former garden and from some of the rooms, including the wrecks of three cars and a boat. In 2012 the property was sold for £1.1 million. By 2020, the house had been renovated by the architect David Adjaye to form a home and studio for the artist Sue Webster.

See also
 Hobby tunneling
 Williamson Tunnels

Sources 

1931 births
2010 deaths
British civil engineers
British people of Irish descent
People from De Beauvoir Town
Tunnels in London